Book of Nursery and Mother Goose Rhymes is a 1954 picture book written and illustrated by Marguerite de Angeli. The book is a collection of Mother Goose rhymes accompanied by illustrations. The book was a recipient of a 1955 Caldecott Honor for its illustrations.

References

1954 children's books
American picture books
Caldecott Honor-winning works